Western Guilford High School is located in Greensboro, North Carolina, and is part of the Guilford County School system. The school has approximately 1,300 students and its sports teams are the Fighting Hornets.

The school opened in the fall of 1968.

In September 2000, Western Guilford was renovated via public bond. The design of the new addition integrates different components of the campus by introducing new circulation patterns. A new entry gallery at the front entry to the school was designed; along with art and classroom additions that form an internal courtyard. The addition consists of four basic elements: Classroom addition to the vocational building, a new "auxiliary" gym, a two-story classroom addition and a single-story art addition.

Greg Newlin is the principal of Western Guilford High. The Student-Teacher ratio is 18:1. The school's mascot is Buzz the Hornet and the school colors are Black and Old Gold. Western is a member of the Metro 3A Conference and the Athletic Director is Christopher Causey.

Beginning the program in 2014, Western Guilford High School was North Carolina's first high school to offer College Board's AP Capstone Program. The AP Capstone Program, also known as the Advanced Placement Academy, is a challenging two-year program designed to train students for the independent research and collaborative projects common in college-level courses.

Advanced Placement Academy
The Advanced Placement Academy was an option for students since the fall of 2014. Western Guilford is the first school in North Carolina to offer the College Board approved AP Capstone Program. Students can apply via application to take part in this unique and rigorous program of study.

All Advanced Placement Academy students participate in enrichment sessions throughout the year. Sessions utilize SpringBoard materials to assist students in preparing for collegiate level writing, test taking, test data analysis, college planning, and career exploration.

Service Learning
Service Learning Diploma: awarded to students who have completed a minimum of 250 hours of service learning in their high school years.
Service Learning Exemplary Award: awarded to students who have completed a minimum of 100 hours of service learning in their high school years.
The school has a group of 8 Service-Learning Ambassadors with a goal of promoting Service-Learning and hosting school-wide service projects.

Athletics
Baseball
Basketball
Cheerleading
Cross country
Football
Golf
Lacrosse
P.E. classes
Soccer
Softball
Swimming
Tennis
Track
Ultimate Frisbee
Volleyball
Wrestling

Demographics
39.4% African American
1.0% American Indian
4.1% Asian
11.4% Hispanic
4.0% Multi-Racial
40.0% White

Notable alumni
 Saundra Baron, soccer goalkeeper, member of Trinidad and Tobago women's national team
 Lisa Stockton, women's college basketball head coach

References

http://wghs.gcsnc.com/pages/Western_Guilford_High

External links 
 

Public high schools in North Carolina
Schools in Greensboro, North Carolina